The Daihatsu C-series engine is a range of compact three-cylinder, internal combustion piston engines, designed by Daihatsu, which is a subsidiary of Toyota. The engines range from 843 to 993 cc and have been manufactured in petrol and diesel-driven series. They have cast iron engine blocks and aluminum cylinder heads, and are of either SOHC or DOHC design, with belt driven heads. The engine first appeared in the all-new Daihatsu Charade in October 1977, in "CB20" form.

Most common is the 1-liter CB, which was also available as the diesel CL. There is an 843 cc version called the CD and the extremely rare 926 cc homologation special called the CE.

CB (993 cc)
The  CB engine appeared in October 1977, for the then-new Daihatsu Charade. It features 120 degree crank throws and a counter-rotating balance shaft. It also incorporated mother concern Toyota's lean-burn design to run cleaner.

It was also fitted to the Daihatsu Hijet, sometimes referred to as the "Daihatsu 1000" when equipped with this engine. It was fitted to the S70/75/76 and S85 models. Italy's Innocenti also used this engine for many variants of their Minitre/990/Small range of cars. De Tomaso was also the first to turbocharge this type of engine, first for a Daihatsu show car and later for the Innocenti Turbo deTomaso.

Versions

CD (843 cc)
The 843 cc CD engine was usually fitted in export market Daihatsu Hijets (also known as the "Daihatsu 850"). Chile (and possibly other markets) also received this engine in the Daihatsu Charade, called the "G20" or "G21" when thus equipped.

CE (926 cc)
The CE engine is turbocharged 926 cc version of 993 cc CB engine, exclusively only for Daihatsu Charade 926 Turbo. The displacement was downsized by reducing the bore size from 76.0 mm to 73.4 mm (73.4 mm x 73.0 mm), this has to be done because of FIA homologation regulation at that time. Daihatsu wanted to take part in the World Rally Championship for cars under 1,300 cc (Group B/9), so with a 1.4 equivalence factor for forced induction engines, this meant that the downsized engine was classified as being of 1296.4 cc.

In 1985, at the Tokyo Motor Show, Daihatsu introduced the 926R, a prototype of a mid engine Charade, developed together with De Tomaso. This race specification CE engine was built in DOHC 12-valve configuration, producing  @6500rpm and  @3500rpm. However, because of significant crashes in the 1985 World Rally Championship, Group B was banned and the 926R project was cancelled.

Only 200 units homologation limited Charade 926 Turbo road car were built by Daihatsu, but the CE engine that was fitted in this car was the SOHC 6-valve version based from bored-down CB50 turbo engine and only producing  @5500rpm and  @3500rpm.

CL (993 cc diesel)

It appeared in 1983, along with the second generation of the Daihatsu Charade. There was also the CL50, a turbocharged version producing . This engine was also used in the Innocenti 990 diesel.

See also
 List of Toyota engines

References

C
Straight-three engines